Valentino Manfredonia (born 29 September 1989) is a Brazilian-born Italian professional boxer. As an amateur he competed at the 2016 Summer Olympics in the men's light heavyweight event, in which he was eliminated in the first round by Mikhail Dauhaliavets of Belarus.

Professional boxing record

References

External links
 

1989 births
Living people
People from Jaboatão dos Guararapes
Italian male boxers
Olympic boxers of Italy
Boxers at the 2016 Summer Olympics
Competitors at the 2018 Mediterranean Games
Boxers at the 2015 European Games
European Games medalists in boxing
European Games silver medalists for Italy
Light-heavyweight boxers
Mediterranean Games competitors for Italy